Congo Airways S.A. is the state-owned flag carrier airline of the Democratic Republic of the Congo (DRC). With a paid-up capital of US$90 million, it started operations on 20 October 2015.

History
Congo Airways was created on 15 August 2014 at the government's instigation, and made its first flight on 20 October 2015 using two Airbus A320 aircraft acquired from Alitalia.  The company initially served Congolese destinations from its base at N'djili Airport in Kinshasa, and has plans to increase its fleet and serve regional and international markets. Air France Consulting provided technical assistance to the airline. One of the airline's aircraft was impounded in Dublin for a few weeks in September 2015 where it was to be painted.

On 10 December 2019, Congo Airways signed a $194.4 million deal to acquire two E175 jets from Embraer. The jets are expected to be delivered in Q4 2020. On 26 May 2020, Congo Airways have converted the firm order made in December 2019 for two E175 aircraft, with purchase rights for two more, into a firm order for two E190-E2 jets, with purchase rights for a further two. The jets are expected to be delivered in Q2 2022. In September 2021, the airline also executed a wet lease of two Embraer 190 aircraft for two years from Kenya Airways.

Corporate affairs

Ownership
The airline is 100% state-controlled, being owned by the Government of the DRC. Shareholders are reported to be various government agencies: the Intermodal Freight Management Office (OGEFREM), the National Social Security Institute (INSS), the General of Quarries and Mines (Gécamines), the Congolese Transport and Ports Society (SCTP), the Industry Promotion Fund (FPI) and the Airway Authority (RVA).

Business trends
Congo Airways does not appear to have published its accounts; also, in an audit dated 28 May 2021 there were detailed allegations that embezzlement and over-invoicing totalling several million dollars had taken place at Congo Airways over recent years. Available figures (largely from AFRAA reports, which contain inconsistencies) are shown below (for years ending 31 December):

Destinations
As of June 2016, the company operates domestic routes from its hub at N'djili Airport in Kinshasa to Goma, Kindu, Kananga, Kisangani, Lubumbashi, Mbandaka and Mbuji-Mayi. In January 2016, the company announced that it wanted to expand services to smaller airports such as Beni and Buta Zega and internationally to Luanda, Pointe Noire, Addis Ababa, Nairobi Jomo Kenyatta, Lagos, and Abidjan. Long-term plans included flights to Dubai Int'l and Guangzhou. In May 2018 the airline commenced flights to Douala and Johannesburg-OR Tambo airport.

Fleet

As of August 2019, the Congo Airways fleet consisted of the following aircraft:

See also
Transport in the Democratic Republic of the Congo

References

External links

Official website

Airlines of the Democratic Republic of the Congo
Airlines established in 2015
Airlines banned in the European Union
2015 establishments in the Democratic Republic of the Congo
Companies based in Kinshasa